Surface to Stage is Threshold's fifth Direct-to-Fan release and their fourth live album, released on the band's website in 2006. The CD contains a concert recorded at the Z7 in Pratteln, Switzerland on their tour for the album Subsurface.

The album's title is a double entendre making reference to the song "Surface to Air" from the 1993 Wounded Land, and Subsurface.

Track listing 

  "Mission Profile" - (8.22)
  "Ground Control" - (7.12)
  "Into The Light" - (8.51)
  "Echoes Of Life" - (8.28)
  "Long Way Home" - (5.57)
  "Opium" - (6.29)
  "The Art Of Reason" - (10.06)
  "Pressure" - (5.22)
  "Flags And Footprints" - (5.10)
  "Light And Space" - (6.05)

Musicians 

Mac: vocals
Karl Groom: guitars / backing vocals
Nick Midson: guitars
Richard West: keyboards / backing vocals
Steve Anderson: bass / backing vocals
Johanne James: drums

Threshold (band) albums
2006 live albums